Bolma mainbaza is a species of sea snail, a marine gastropod mollusk in the family Turbinidae, the turban snails.

Distribution
This marine species occurs in the Mozambique Channel.

References

External links
 To Encyclopedia of Life
 To World Register of Marine Species
 MNHN: Bolma mainbaza

mainbaza
Gastropods described in 2010